Why Buffy Matters: The Art of Buffy the Vampire Slayer is a 2005 academic publication relating to the fictional Buffyverse established by TV series, Buffy and Angel.

Book description

Rhonda Wilcox, (an editor of Slayage: the online journal) presents an argument for Buffy as an art form as worthy of respect and acknowledgment as film or literature. She highlights depth of characters and symbolism in the show.

The start of the book deals with everything from the significance of the characters' names in relation to their identities to parallels between Buffy and the Harry Potter saga, while the last half of the book offers analyses of seven of Buffy's episodes. ("Surprise", "Innocence", "The Zeppo", "Hush", "Restless", "The Body", and "Once More, with Feeling".)

Contents

Books about the Buffyverse
2005 non-fiction books
I.B. Tauris books